The Moultrie Observer, "your friend and neighbor since 1894," is a weekly newspaper published in Moultrie, Georgia. The paper is distributed on Wednesdays. 

Gannett acquired the paper with its acquisition of Multimedia in 1995. Thomson acquired the paper from Gannett in 1997 and sold it to current owner Community Newspaper Holdings in 2000.

References

External links 
 Observer Website
 CNHI Website

Newspapers published in Georgia (U.S. state)
Colquitt County, Georgia
Publications established in 1894